Daisy Wai is a Canadian politician who represents the riding of Richmond Hill in the Legislative Assembly of Ontario. A member of the Progressive Conservative Party of Ontario, she was first elected in the 2018 provincial election, defeating Liberal incumbent Reza Moridi by more than 10,000 votes.

Early career 
Wai is an entrepreneur who launched her Canadian business through the Prosper Canada's Self-Employment Benefit program. Wai went on to serve as a member of the Prosper Canada's board of directors.

2018 provincial election 
Wai stated that her objective was to encourage and increase political involvement within the Chinese community.

Community involvement 
Wai is a former member of the York Regional Police Services Board and a former chairperson for the Richmond Hill Chamber of Commerce.

Awards 
Wai is a recipient of the Queen Elizabeth Golden and Diamond Memorial Medal, Richmond Hill Chamber of Commerce Business Achievement Award, Chinese Canadian Entrepreneurs Award, Town of Richmond Hill Volunteer Achievement Award and  Canada 150 Women Award.

Electoral record

References

Living people
Progressive Conservative Party of Ontario MPPs
Women MPPs in Ontario
Canadian politicians of Chinese descent
Businesspeople from Ontario
Canadian advertising executives
People from Richmond Hill, Ontario
21st-century Canadian women politicians
Year of birth missing (living people)